"Lost and Found" is the second track from Think Visual, a 1986 album by The Kinks. It was written by The Kinks' primary songwriter, Ray Davies.

Lyrics

The lyrics of "Lost and Found" were inspired by the recent Hurricane Gloria, which describe a New York City couple who lost each other when the hurricane was about to hit the area. "We're near the eye of the storm," the singer sings. "This is really heavy weather." However, just as "the hurricane [was] crossing the coast line," the couple "were lost and found, in the nick of time." The lovers say, "we beat the fear, we came through the storm [and] now it all seems clear. We were lost and found, standing here looking at the new frontier".

Release and reception
"Lost and Found" was first released as the second song on the Think Visual album. However, the track was released as a standalone single in both Britain (the second single from Think Visual) and America (the third single from Think Visual). Although it did not chart on the Billboard Hot 100 or U.K. Singles Chart, it did reach #37 on the Mainstream Rock Chart in America, matching the peak of "Rock 'n' Roll Cities" (also from Think Visual) on the same chart.

"Lost and Found", aside from its appearance on Think Visual, was featured in other albums as well. A live version of the song appeared on Live: The Road, and the studio version was featured as the title track of the 1991 compilation album, Lost & Found (1986-1989) (an album which covered the highlights of The Kinks' tenure with MCA.)

"Lost and Found" has generally received positive reviews from music critics. Rolling Stone'''s David Wild described the track as "a gorgeous ballad about a couple in New York City weathering their own storm as a hurricane sweeps across the coastline." Stephen Thomas Erlewine of AllMusic noted "Lost and Found" as a highlight from the Think Visual LP.  Cash Box'' praised its melodicism.

Music video
Once again, a video (starring The Kinks) was filmed to promote "Lost and Found". In the video, an orchestra performs the track with the members of The Kinks, as a film is displayed in the background. This video features Ray Davies in antique clothing. One of the instrument players catches the eye of Davies in this display, and enters the film to unite with him. Francine Brody is the woman cellist.

References

The Kinks songs
1987 singles
Songs written by Ray Davies
Song recordings produced by Ray Davies
1986 songs
MCA Records singles